John Clarence Watts (July 9, 1902 – September 24, 1971) was a U.S. Representative from Kentucky.

Born in Nicholasville, Kentucky, Watts attended the public schools.
He was graduated from the University of Kentucky in 1925 and from its law school in 1927.
He was admitted to the bar in 1927 and commenced the practice of law in Nicholasville, Kentucky.
Also operated a farm.
Police judge of Nicholasville, Kentucky from 1929 to 1933.
County attorney of Jessamine County, Kentucky from 1933 to 1945.
He served as member of the State house of representatives in 1947 and 1948, serving as floor leader.
He served as commissioner of motor transportation for State of Kentucky 1948-1951.

Watts was elected as a Democrat to the Eighty-second Congress, by special election, April 4, 1951, to fill the vacancy caused by the resignation of Thomas R. Underwood.
He was reelected to the ten succeeding Congresses and served from April 4, 1951, until his death from a stroke in Lexington, Kentucky on September 24, 1971.
He was interred in Maple Grove Cemetery, Nicholasville, Kentucky. Watts did not sign the 1956 Southern Manifesto, and voted in favor of the Civil Rights Acts of 1960 and 1968, as well as the 24th Amendment to the U.S. Constitution and the Voting Rights Act of 1965, but voted against the Civil Rights Acts of 1957 and 1964.

See also
 List of United States Congress members who died in office (1950–99)

References

External links 
 

1902 births
1971 deaths
People from Nicholasville, Kentucky
Democratic Party members of the United States House of Representatives from Kentucky
Democratic Party members of the Kentucky House of Representatives
20th-century American politicians